Pinewood - The American International School is an American international school in Thermi, Thessaloniki regional unit, Greece. It serves grades Pre-Kindergarten through 12 and uses English as its language of instruction.

References

External links

 Pinewood - The American International School

International schools in Thessaloniki
Thessaloniki